Thomas Everett "Thom" Eberhardt (born March 7, 1947) is an American film director, producer and screenwriter. Eberhardt has won two awards and two nominations. He is most noted for his work on Without a Clue, Honey, I Blew Up the Kid, and the cult classic Night of the Comet.

Partial filmography
 Sole Survivor (1984) (director, writer)
 Night of the Comet (1984) (director, writer)
 The Night Before (1988)
 Without a Clue (1988) (director)
 Gross Anatomy (1989) (director)
 All I Want for Christmas (1991) (writer)
 Honey, I Blew Up the Kid (1992) (writer)
 Captain Ron (1992) (director, writer)
 Twice Upon a Time (1998 TV movie) (director)
 Ratz (2000 TV movie) (director, writer)
 I Was a Teenage Faust (2002) (director, writer)
 Naked Fear (2007) (director)

References

External links

1947 births
American male screenwriters
American television directors
Film directors from Los Angeles
Film producers from California
Living people
Screenwriters from California
Writers from Los Angeles